The battle of In Emsal took place during the Tuareg rebellion of 2012. On 20 January, a Malian military convoy that came to rescue the garrison of Aguelhoc was ambushed by rebels of MLNA, and terrorists of Ansar Dine and AQIM.

The battle
Following the attack on the town of Aguelhoc by the MNLA, Ansar Dine, and AQIM rebels, a Malian military convoy commanded by Colonel Ould Meydou, leader of a group of Arab militiamen, departed Gao on January 19 heading to Aguelhok in the North. But too confident, he did not send scouts to search the region for rebels, and the next day, 15 kilometers south of Aguel'hoc, the Malian column attacked by MLNA-Islamist coalition. The battle took place in the Wadi of In Emsal (also called Imenzad or Imezzehene). The clash lasted all day, and the Malians finally forced to turn around, carrying several wounded with them not being able to reach their, destination.

Casualties
According to an MNLA statement issued on 22 January by Communication Officer Bakay Ag Hamed Ahmed, the Malian losses were 50 dead, 25 prisoners, 26 vehicles captured, 40 vehicles destroyed, 1 tank, and 1 BRDM. The MNLA claimed that it had only two wounded i its ranks.
Mossa Ag Attaher, another spokesman for the MNLA, responsible for media relations, gave a higher score on 21 January. According to him the Malian losses are 101 dead, 65 prisoners, 4 military trucks burned and 5 BRDM destroyed. The convoy consisted of 40 vehicles, including Toyota pick-ups equipped with machine guns, BRDMs and troop transport trucks. For its part, the Malian government recognized only a dozen deaths on its side during the battle.

References

2012 in Mali
In Emsal
Menaka
History of Azawad
In Emsal